John Baptiste Fournet (July 27, 1895 – June 3, 1984) was an American attorney and politician who served as Speaker of the Louisiana House of Representatives, lieutenant governor of Louisiana from 1932 to 1935, and a justice of the Louisiana Supreme Court, serving as an associate justice from 1935 to 1949, and as Chief Justice by seniority from 1949 to 1970.

Early life, education, and career
Born in St. Martinville, Fournet attended Louisiana State Normal College, and was a teacher, and even principal at Morganza High School for a period before entering the law school of LSU in 1917. His studies were interrupted by service in World War I, after which he received an LL.B. from Louisiana State University in 1920.

Political and judicial career
A supporter of Huey P. Long, Fournet served in the Louisiana House of Representatives from 1928 to 1932, and as lieutenant governor of Louisiana from 1932 to 1935, when Fournet was elected to the Louisiana Supreme Court. Fournet was walking next to Long when the latter was assassinated later that year.

Fournet became chief justice of Louisiana by seniority in 1949, and remained on the court until 1970, when he reached the maximum age of service.

References

Lieutenant Governors of Louisiana
Speakers of the Louisiana House of Representatives
Democratic Party members of the Louisiana House of Representatives
Northwestern State University alumni
Louisiana State University alumni
Louisiana lawyers
American military personnel of World War I
United States Army soldiers
People from St. Martinville, Louisiana
People from Jennings, Louisiana
American school principals
1895 births
1984 deaths
Chief Justices of the Louisiana Supreme Court
20th-century American judges
Huey Long